The Duchy of Estonia, also known as Swedish Estonia, was a dominion of the Swedish Empire from 1561 until 1721 during the time that most or all of Estonia was under Swedish rule. The land was eventually ceded to Russia in the Treaty of Nystad, following its capitulation, during the plague, in the Great Northern War.

It is also colloquially known as the "good old Swedish times" by Estonians, but this expression was not used before the following Russian rule, in the beginning of which the situation of Estonian peasantry declined rapidly; to gain the support of the German Baltic nobility, Russia gave them more power over the peasantry.

Head of Dominion 
 Governors (1561–1674)

  Friherre of Nynäs, from Sundholm (2 August 1561 – 27 February 1562)
 Klas Horn of Åminne (acting) (August 1561) 
 Henrik Klasson Horn from Kankas (1st time) (27 February 1562 – June 1562) 
 Svante Stensson Sture (30 June 1562 – 27 July 1564)
  from Lechtis (1564–1565) 
 Henrik Klasson Horn from Kankas (2nd time) (30 January 1565 – 1568)
  from Mörby (November 1568 – 1570) 
  from Lepas (9 October 1570 – 1572) 
 Clas Åkesson Tott (6 November 1572 – 1574) 
 Pontus De la Gardie (4 June 1574 – December 1575) 
  from Kankas (1st time) (January 1576 – May 1578) 
 Nilsson Hans Eriksson Finn from Brinkala (acting) (19 April 1576 – 1577) 
  (1st time) (1 August 1577 – 1580) 
  from Kyala (1580–1581) 
 Göran Boije af Gennäs (2nd time) (25 April 1582 – 1583) 
 Pontus De la Gardie (1583 – 5 November 1585)
  (8 November 1585 – 1588) 
 Hans Wachtmeister (acting) (July 1588 – 13 October 1588) 
 Gustaf Axelsson Banér from Djurshom (13 October 1588 – 1590) 
  af Lindö (1590 – July 1592) 
 Göran Boije af Gennäs (3rd time) (1592 – June 1600) 
 Karl Henriksson Horn from Kankas (2nd time) (acting) (1600 – 30 January 1601) 
  Count of Raseborg (1601 – October 1602) 
 ... (October 1602 – May 1605)
 Nils Turesson Bielke (10 May 1605 – June 1605)
 Axel Nilsson Ryning (1605–1608)
 ... (1608–1611)
 Gabriel Bengtsson Oxenstierna (1611–1617)
 Anders Eriksson Hästehufvud (1617–1619)
 Jakob De la Gardie (July 1619 – 1622) 
 Per Gustafsson Banér af Tussa (1622 – January 1626) 
  Friherre of Eckholm (1626 – October 1628)
   from Arnö (1628 – 17 July 1642) 
  Friherre of Kimito (26 July 1642 – 1646) 
 , Count of Södermöre (9 September 1646 – 1653) 
  (1st time) (acting) (May 1653 – 16 August 1653) 
 , Count of Thurn (16 August 1653 – 1655) 
 Wilhelm Ulrich (2nd time) (acting) (1655 – August 1655) 
 Bengt Skytte (1655–1656) 
 Wilhelm Ulrich (3rd time) (acting) (1655– 2 August 1656) 
  (2 August 1656 – November 1674)
 Wilhelm Ulrich (4th time) (acting) (1656–1659)
  (acting) (1674)

Governors-General (1674–1728)

Andreas Lennartson Torstensson (1674–1681)
Robert Johannson Lichton (April 1681 – 1687)
Nils Turesson Bielke (20 January 1687 – 19 April 1687)
Axel Julius De la Gardie from Läckö Castle, Lidköping (1687 – December 1704)
Wolmar Anton von Schlippenbach (December 1704 – 6 July 1706)
Niels Jonsson Stromberg af Clastorp (6 July 1706 – 23 October 1709)
Carl Nieroth (23 October 1709 – 10 October 1710)

See also 
Estonia under Swedish rule
Dominium maris baltici
Dominions of Sweden
Swedish Livonia
Estonian Swedes
Governorate of Estonia
Uniformity policy

References

Sources

Online encyclopedia – WorldStatesmen.org

1721 disestablishments in Europe
States and territories established in 1561
Dominions of Sweden
Duchy of Estonia (1561–1721)
Estonia–Sweden relations
1561 establishments in Sweden
States and territories disestablished in 1721